"The Best Days" is the third single released by Australian singer Nikki Webster from her debut album, Follow Your Heart (2001). It peaked at number 21 on the Australian ARIA Singles Chart in December 2001. The second track on the CD single includes a cover of "Over the Rainbow" from The Wizard of Oz.

The music video was filmed at Stradbroke Island in Queensland over a three-day period. Webster's older brother Scott appears in the music video, riding on a jet ski with her.

Track listing

Charts

References

2001 singles
2001 songs
Nikki Webster songs
Songs written by Axel Breitung
Songs written by Mark Holden